Adrián Kirzner Schwartz (born March 25, 1968), better known as Adrián Suar, is an Argentine actor, media producer and businessman who is the program director of Canal 13.

Early life 
Adrián Suar born in Queens, New York City, on March 25, 1968. His father was Leibele Schwartz. When he was two, Suar moved to Argentina with his family.

When he was 13, Suar auditioned for a casting for Channel 9 and obtained his first role in an episode of a television series called El Ciclo de Guillermo Bredeston y Nora Cárpena. He landed his first major role in 1982 as Adrián in a television series called Pelito, a popular series on Channel 13.

Career 
Suar started working in the TV series Pelito at the early age of 13. He then worked in other TV shows such as La Banda del Golden Rocket, Poliladron, Por el Nombre de Dios, 22, El Loco, and Sin código, and for films such as Comodines, Cohen vs Rossi, Apariencias, El hijo de la novia, El día que me amen and 18-J.

Together with Fernando Blanco, Suar created in 1994 Pol-Ka, one of the three most important TV producing companies in Argentina, with shows that have been exported to other countries.

Among the series and films produced by Pol-Ka are Por el Nombre de Dios, Comodines, El Hijo de la Novia and Luna de Avellaneda.

Personal life 
Suar married, and later divorced, Argentine actress Araceli González, with whom he had a child named Tomás. Suar was in a relationship with Argentine actress Griselda Siciliani for eight years, and on June 15, 2012, they had a daughter named Margarita. Their relationship lasted from 2008 to 2016.

Awards 
 2013 Tato award as best lead actor in comedy
 2013 Martín Fierro Awards: Best lead actor of daily comedy (for Solamente Vos)

References

External links 
 
 
 Fan site with Biography 
 Pol-Ka Productions 
 Pol-Ka Films

1968 births
Argentine businesspeople
Argentine television personalities
Argentine film producers
Living people
Male actors from New York City
American emigrants to Argentina
American people of Argentine-Jewish descent
Citizens of Argentina through descent
Argentine Jews